The 2000–01 Phoenix Coyotes season was their fifth season in the National Hockey League, the franchise's 22nd season in the NHL and 29th overall. Before the season began, Wayne Gretzky became a part owner. The Coyotes failed to qualify for the playoffs for the first time since 1995 when they were known as the Winnipeg Jets.

Offseason
On June 2, 2000, Wayne Gretzky was introduced by Phoenix Coyotes Owner & Chairman Steve Ellman as the managing partner of the Coyotes in charge of all hockey operations. Gretzky did not officially begin his new role until February 15, 2001 — the date Ellman's ownership group completed the purchase of the Coyotes.
Among his first moves, Gretzky brought in proven Stanley Cup winners such as Cliff Fletcher (as senior executive vice president) and Dave Draper (as vice president of scouting and player personnel) to direct the Coyotes' hockey operations department.  Six months later, Gretzky added Michael Barnett, the former president of IMG Hockey, as the Coyotes' general manager.

Regular season
Captain Keith Tkachuk was traded in March.

Final standings

Schedule and results

Player statistics

Regular season
Scoring

Goaltending

Awards and records

Transactions

Trades

Waivers

Free agents

Draft picks
Phoenix's draft picks at the 2000 NHL Entry Draft held at the Pengrowth Saddledome in Calgary, Alberta.

References
 Coyotes on Hockey Database

Pho
Pho
Arizona Coyotes seasons